James (Jim) Alan Harra,  (born July 1962) is a British civil servant who has been First Permanent Secretary and Chief Executive of HM Revenue and Customs since October 2019, in succession to Sir Jonathan Thompson.

Background 
Harra's family are based at Dollingstown in County Down, Northern Ireland. He was educated at Donaghcloney Primary School, Tandragee Junior High School and then Portadown College. He read law at Queen's University, Belfast and then became an inspector of taxes with the Inland Revenue in 1984.

Career 
In January 2009, Harra became Director of Corporation Tax and VAT, and then Director of Personal Tax Customer Operations in March 2011, and Director Personal Tax Operations in October 2011. He was Director-General for Business Tax from 2012 to 2016, when he succeeded Edward Troup as Tax Assurance Commissioner. He became Tax Assurance Commissioner and Director General Customer Strategy and Design in October 2016 and was appointed Second Permanent Secretary at HMRC in November 2017. He is also a member of the Board of the department.

In November 2017, Harra appeared on BBC's Panorama programme about VAT fraud.

Harra is also HMRC's LGB&T Champion.

Honours 
Harra was appointed a Companion of the Order of the Bath (CB) in the 2015 New Year Honours.

Offices held

References 

Chief Executives of HM Revenue and Customs
Companions of the Order of the Bath
Living people
1962 births